Bab El Oued is a neighbourhood in Algiers, the capital of Algeria, along the coast north of the city centre. As of 2008, the population of the commune of Bab El Oued was 64,732.

History

During the existence of French Algeria, Bab El Oued was established as the main neighbourhood of poor pied-noirs, including many poor fishermen. Towards the end of the Algerian War, the neighbourhood became the stronghold of the Organisation armée secrète, until OAS attacks on the French Army led them to assault and purge the neighbourhood, during the siege of Bab el Oued in March 1962. Soon after, Algeria became independent, and the pied noir population fled the country. The neighbourhood was then settled by Muslim Algerians. The neighbourhood again gained notoriety during the leadup to the Algerian Civil War (which broke out in 1991) as a stronghold of the Islamic Salvation Front, or FIS. Its population in 1998 was 102,200.

Notable people
 Sofia Boutella 
 Dida Diafat
 Djamel Keddou
 Baya Rahouli
 Abdul Abdullah Yahia
 Abd al-Rahman al-Tha'alibi is buried here

References

Communes of Algiers Province
Neighbourhoods in Algeria